The following is a list of events and releases that have happened or are expected to happen in 2012 in African music.

Events
date unknown
Johnny Clegg receives the Order of Ikhamanga, Silver - the highest honour a citizen can receive in South Africa - as part of the National Orders ceremony. The award is presented by President Jacob Zuma.
Tats Nkonzo gains recognition for his musical contributions to the eNews Channel's satirical news show Late Nite News with Loyiso Gola

Albums released in 2012

Classical

Musical films
Zambezia (animation), with music by Bruce Retief

Deaths
January 17 – Mohamed Rouicha, 61, Moroccan folk singer
February 18 – Mohammed Wardi, 79, Sudanese singer and songwriter
April 8 – George Wilberforce Kakoma, 89, Ugandan musician, composer of the Ugandan national anthem
November 30 – Kélétigui Diabaté, 81, Malian musician

See also 
 2012 in music

References 

Africa
African music
2012 in Africa